Becoming Zlatan is a 2015 Swedish independent coming-of age sports documentary about Swedish International association football player Zlatan Ibrahimović. The film was directed by brothers Fredrik and Magnus Gertten and follows Ibrahimović through his formative years with football clubs Malmö FF and AFC Ajax all the way to his break through with Juventus F.C. in 2005.

The film has been featured at several film festivals including the International Documentary Film Festival Amsterdam, Helsinki Documentary Film Festival and the Rouen Nordic Film Festival.

Synopsis
The film tells the story of Swedish association football player Zlatan Ibrahimović, during his formative years, through archival footage, including rare interviews with a young Ibrahimović where he speaks about his personal life and the obstacles he has met along the way. The film follows Ibrahimović from his debut with the Swedish club Malmö FF in 1999, his turbulent years with the Dutch club AFC Ajax, all the way up to his breakthrough with the Italian football club Juventus F.C. The film traces his life as a troubled youth with seemingly insurmountable challenges stemming from his private life, up until joining the global stage as an international star. As a talented young player, Ibrahimović is faced with constant pressure of living up to his expectations, while balancing the challenges he faces at home and in his career path.

Cast
 Marco van Basten as himself
 Leo Beenhakker as himself
 Hasse Borg as himself
 Fabio Capello as himself
 David Endt as himself
 Jan van Halst as himself
 Ahmed Hossam Hussein Abdelhamid as himself
 Zlatan Ibrahimović as himself
 Ronald Koeman as himself
 Jari Litmanen as himself
 Andy van der Meyde as himself
 Luciano Moggi as himself
 Yksel Osmanovski as himself

See also

Cinema of Sweden

References

External links

2015 films
Swedish documentary films
Swedish association football films
Films set in Sweden
Films set in the Netherlands
Films set in Italy
2010s sports films
2015 documentary films
Documentary films about association football
Malmö FF
AFC Ajax
Juventus F.C. in popular culture
Dutch-language films
2010s English-language films
2010s Italian-language films
2010s Swedish-language films
2015 multilingual films
Swedish multilingual films
2010s Swedish films